Korsakovsky District is an administrative and municipal district (raion), one of the twenty-four in Oryol Oblast, Russia. It is located in the northeast of the oblast. Its administrative center is the rural locality (a selo) of Korsakovo. Population: 4,798 (2010 Census);  The population of Korsakovo accounts for 30.3% of the district's total population.

References

Notes

Sources

Districts of Oryol Oblast